Anthocharis stella, the stella orangetip, is a species of butterfly found mainly in the Rocky Mountains in the United States where its caterpillar feeds on different kinds of rock cress. It has two subspecies.

References

External links
 Stella orangetip, Butterflies of Canada

Anthocharis
Butterflies described in 1872
Butterflies of North America